During the Iraq War, many insurgents, al-Qaeda and militant fighters were captured and held at military bases in the region. On several occasions, there were instances of prisoner escapes.

2007
March, eleven Iraqi prisoners escaped from the British-run military prison at Shuaiba Base, after ten of them swapped their outfits with visitors to the prison. No details were given on the eleventh prisoner.

2006
December 10, Ayman Sabawi an insurgent financier serving fifteen years imprisonment for possession of illegal weapons and manufacture of explosives, escaped from prison with the help of a local police officer. He was the nephew of deposed leader Saddam Hussein.
May 9, five prisoners escaped the US-run Fort Suse military prison. While their names were not released to the media, photographs of the three Arab, one Kurdish and one unknown escapee were distributed to local residents.

2005
December 28, a failed escape attempt at Adala Base by sixteen prisoners left four prisoners, four guards and an interpreter dead, after the prisoners stormed the military prison's armoury and one prisoner got a hold of an AK-47 rifle and began shooting. The incident prompted Bhushu Ibrahim Ali, Deputy Justice Minister for Prisons, to state that negligence was at fault and Iraqi troops were unprepared to run prisons.

March 26, after noticing clay and dirt clogging one of the camp toilets, guards at Camp Bucca military prison discovered two "extremely elaborate" tunnels built by prisoners in preparation of a mass escape. It is believed the prisoners were waiting for poor weather to aid their flight. One of the tunnels was dug beneath a floorboard, and extended more than 600 feet, past the security fence surrounding the prison. The tunnels ran ten feet beneath the surface, and were 2–3 feet in diameter.

References

External links
 Một loạt phiến quân al-Qaeda vượt ngục ở Iraq 

Escapes
2000s in Iraq